is a former Japanese footballer of Irish descent.

Club career
Cullen is a forward, Cullen made his senior football debut for Júbilo Iwata on 5 May 2004, Oita Trinita being the opponent.

Cullen started training in the youth ranks at Kashiwa Reysol before eventually joining the team at Funabashi Municipal High School. After his graduation, he signed with Jubilo Iwata in 2004. Although mostly limited to substitute appearances and the occasional league cup start in his rookie year, big things were expected of Cullen as he matured and gained experience playing with such seasoned professionals as Masashi Nakayama and Toshiya Fujita.

He left Júbilo in 2010 to join Roasso Kumamoto of J2 League. In January 2011 it was announced that Cullen joined Dutch Eredivisie club VVV-Venlo, best known in Japan for featuring another Japanese, Maya Yoshida, and having been Keisuke Honda's first European club. In July 2018, Cullen signed for English non-league side Leatherhead FC.

National team career
In 2005, Cullen selected Japanese citizenship in order to be able to play for the Japanese national team. He was a member of the Japan U-20 national team which played in the 2005 World Youth Championship held in the Netherlands. He played all 4 matches.

In February 2012 it was reported that Michael O'Neill had contacted Cullen with a view to convincing him to play for the Northern Ireland national team.

Club statistics

1
2
3
4

References

External links
 

  
  

1985 births
Living people
Association football people from Ibaraki Prefecture
People from Tsuchiura
Japanese footballers
Japan youth international footballers
J1 League players
J2 League players
Eredivisie players
K League 2 players
Júbilo Iwata players
Roasso Kumamoto players
VVV-Venlo players
Seoul E-Land FC players
Japanese expatriate footballers
Expatriate footballers in the Netherlands
Japanese expatriate sportspeople in the Netherlands
Expatriate footballers in Thailand
Japanese expatriate sportspeople in Thailand
Expatriate footballers in South Korea
Japanese expatriate sportspeople in South Korea
Footballers at the 2006 Asian Games
Japanese people of Irish descent
Association football forwards
Asian Games competitors for Japan